Tucanoan (also Tukanoan, Tukánoan) is a language family of Colombia, Brazil, Ecuador, and Peru.

Language contact
Jolkesky (2016) notes that there are lexical similarities with the Arutani, Paez, Sape, Taruma, Witoto-Okaina, Saliba-Hodi, Tikuna-Yuri, Pano, Barbakoa, Bora-Muinane, and Choko language families due to contact.

Classification

Chacon (2014)
There are two dozen Tucanoan languages. There is a clear binary split between Eastern Tucanoan and Western Tucanoan.

Western Tucanoan
?Cueretú (Kueretú) †
Napo
Orejón ( M'áíhɨ̃ki, Maijiki, Coto, Koto, Payoguaje, Payaguá, Payowahe, Payawá)
Correguaje–Secoya
Correguaje (Koreguaje, Korewahe, a.k.a. Caquetá)
Siona–Secoya (Upper Napo, Baicoca–Siecoca)
?Macaguaje ( Kakawahe, Piohé) †
Siona (Bai Coca, Sioni, Pioje, Pioche-Sioni, Tetete)
Secoya (Sieko Coca, Airo Pai, Piohé)
?Tama †
Eastern Tucanoan
South
Tanimuca (a.k.a. Retuarã)
?Yauna (Jaúna, Yahuna, Yaúna) †
West
Barasana–Macuna
Macuna (a.k.a. Buhagana, Wahana, Makuna-Erulia, Makuna)
Barasana (Southern Barasano, a.k.a. Paneroa, Eduria, Edulia, Comematsa, Janera, Taibano, Taiwaeno, Taiwano)
Cubeo–Desano
Cubeo (Cuveo, Kobeua, Kubewa)
Yupua–Desano
?Yupuá †
Desano–Siriano (a.k.a. Desano)
East
Central
Tucano (Tukana, a.k.a. Dasea)
Waimaha–Tatuyo
Waimajã (a.k.a. Bara, Northern Barasano)
Tatuyo
North
Kotiria–Piratapuyo
Guanano (Wanana, Wanano, a.k.a. Kotedia, Kotiria, Wanana-Pirá)
Piratapuyo (a.k.a. Waikina, Uiquina)
Pisamira–Yuruti
Pisamira–Carapano (Carapana, Karapana)
Tuyuca–Yuruti
Tuyuka (Tejuca, Teyuka, Tuyuca, a.k.a. Bara, Barasana)
Yurutí

Plus unclassified Miriti.†

Most languages are, or were, spoken in Colombia.

Jolkesky (2016)
Internal classification by Jolkesky (2016):

(† = extinct)

Tukano
Tukano, Western
Kueretu †
Tukano, Western, Nuclear
Mai Huna
Koreguaje-Pioje
Koreguaje-Tama
Koreguaje
Tama †
Pioje (Baicoca–Siecoca)
Makaguaje †
Sekoya
Siona
Tetete †
Tukano, Eastern
Tanimuka; Retuarã; Yahuna
Tukano, Eastern, West
Kubeo-Desano
Kubeo
Desano-Yupua
Desano; Siriano
Yupua †
Makuna; Barasano; Eduria
Tukano, Eastern, East
Tukano-Tatuyo
Tukano
Tatuyo-Bara-Waimaha
Tatuyo
Bara; Waimaha
Tuyuka-Wanano
Wanano-Piratapuyu
Wanano
Piratapuyo
Tuyuka-Karapanã
Karapanã; Pisamira
Tuyuka; Yuruti

Varieties
Below is a full list of Tucanoan language varieties listed by Loukotka (1968), including names of unattested varieties.

Western group
Tama - spoken on the Yarú River and Caguán River, Caquetá territory, Colombia, but now perhaps extinct.
Coreguaje - spoken at the sources of the Caquetá River, department of Cauca, Colombia.
Amaguaje / Encabellado / Rumo - extinct language once spoken on the Aguarico River, department of Loreto, Peru.
Siona / Zeona / Ceño / Kokakañú - language spoken at the sources of the Putumayo River and Caquetá River, Putumayo territory, Colombia.
Ificuene - spoken between the Güepi River and Aguarico River, Loreto. (Unattested.)
Eno - language spoken by a few individuals at the mouth of the San Miguel River, Caquetá territory, Colombia. (Unattested.)
Secoya - language spoken on the Putumayo River, Oriente province, Ecuador. (Johnson and Peeke 1962.)
Icaguate - extinct language once spoken on the Caucaya River and Putumayo River, Putumayo territory, Colombia.
Macaguaje - spoken in the same territory on the Mecaya River and Caucaya River and around Puerto Restrepo, by a few families.
Tetete / Eteteguaje - extinct language once spoken at the sources of the Güepi River, Loreto. (Unattested.)
Pioje / Angotero / Ancutere - spoken on the Napo River, Tarapoto River, and Aguarico River, Loreto.
Cóto / Payoguaje - spoken at the mouth of the Napo River, Loreto, Peru.

Yahuna group
Yahuna / Jaúna - spoken on the Apoporis River, territory of Amazonas, Colombia.
Tanimuca / Opaina - spoken by a small tribe on the Popeyaca River and Guacayá River, Amazonas, Colombia.
Dätuana - spoken north of the preceding tribe on the Apoporis River.
Menimehe - spoken by a very little known tribe at the mouth of the Mirití-paraná River and Caquetá River. (Unattested.)

Yupua group
Yupua / Hiupiá - spoken on the Coca River, a tributary of the Apoporis River, Colombia.
Kushiita - once spoken at the mouth of the Apoporis River, state of Amazonas, Brazil. Now perhaps extinct. (Unattested.)
Durina / Sokó - spoken on the Carapato River, Amazonas territory, Colombia.

Coretu group
Coretu / Kueretú - spoken on the Mirití-paraná River, state of Amazonas, Brazil.

Cubeo group
Cubeo / Kobéua / Kaniwa / Hahanana - spoken on the Caiarí River and Cuduiarí River, state of Amazonas, Brazil. Dialects are:
Dyuremáwa / Yiboia-tapuya - spoken on the Querarí River, Amazonas.
Bahukíwa / Bahuna - spoken by a tribe that originally spoke a language of the Arawak stock, on the Cuduiarí River.
Hehénawa - spoken on the Cuduiarí River.
Hölöua - spoken on the Cuduiarí River, now perhaps extinct. (Unattested.)

Särä group
Särä - spoken between the Tiquié River and Piraparaná River, Vaupés territory, Colombia.
Ömöa - spoken at the sources of the Tiquié River, Colombia.
Buhágana / Karawatana - spoken on the Piraparaná River, Colombia.
Macuna - spoken at the mouth of the Apoporis River, Colombia.

Erulia group
Erulia / Paboa / Eduria - spoken on the Piraparaná River, Colombia.
Tsaloa - spoken on the Piraparaná River.
Palänoa - spoken on the middle course of the Piraparaná River.

Desána group
Desána / Wína / Vina - spoken between the Tiquié River and Caiarí River, partly in Colombia and partly in Brazil.
Chiránga / Siriána - spoken on the Paca-igarapé River, Colombia.

Tucano group
Tucano / Tocano / Dace / Dagseje / Dajseá / Tocana - language of a large tribe that lived on the Vaupés and Tiquié River; state of Amazonas, Brazil.
Uaíana - on the Caiary River, Colombia.
Tuyuca / Doxcapura - spoken on the Tiquié River and Papury River, partly in Brazil, partly in Colombia.
Arapaso / Koréa - extinct language once spoken on the Yapú River, Amazonas, Brazil. The last survivors now speak only Tucano. (Unattested.)
Waikína / Uiquina / Uaíkana / Pira-tapuya - spoken on the Papury River, Colombia.
Uantya / Puçá-tapuya - once spoken on the Macú-igarapé River, Colombia.
Bará / Pocanga - spoken at the sources of the Tiquié River, Colombia.
Uasöna / Pisa-tapuya - spoken on the Caiary River, Colombia.
Tsölá / Teiuana - spoken on the Tiquié River and Piraparaná River, Colombia.
Urubú-tapuyo - extinct language once spoken at the sources of the Caiary River, Colombia.
Pamöá / Tatú-tapuyo - spoken at the sources of the Papury River and on the Tuyigarapé, Colombia.
Patsoca / Iuruty-tapuyo - once spoken on the Abio River and Apoporis River, Colombia.
Möxdöá / Carapana-tapuya - spoken between the Papury River and Caiary River, Colombia.
Uanána / Wanána / Kotédia - spoken on the Caiarí River near the Cachoeira dos Araras, Brazil.

Vocabulary
Loukotka (1968) lists the following basic vocabulary items.

Proto-language
Proto-Tukanoan reconstructions by Chacon (2013):

References

Bibliography
 Campbell, Lyle. (1997). American Indian languages: The historical linguistics of Native America. New York: Oxford University Press. .
 Kaufman, Terrence. (1990). Language history in South America: What we know and how to know more. In D. L. Payne (Ed.), Amazonian linguistics: Studies in lowland South American languages (pp. 13–67). Austin: University of Texas Press. .
 Kaufman, Terrence. (1994). The native languages of South America. In C. Mosley & R. E. Asher (Eds.), Atlas of the world's languages (pp. 46–76). London: Routledge.

External links

 Proel: Familia Tucanoana

 
Language families
Indigenous languages of the South American Northwest
Indigenous languages of Western Amazonia